The Belgian national bobsleigh team represents Belgium in international bobsledding competitions. Belgium first gained fame in bobsleighing during their debut at the first Winter Olympics in Chamonix in 1924, where a Belgian four-man bob acquired the bronze medal. The second and last Belgian bobsleigh medal at the Winter Olympics so far, also won during a four-man event, was a silver in St. Moritz in 1948.

After Belgian bobsleighs were absent during 58 years of Winter Olympics, a Belgian delegation of two female bobsleighers (Elfje Willemsen and Eva Willemarck) participated at the Vancouver 2010 edition. Shortly after, the Belgian bobsleigh selection with two female bobsleighers received the nickname Belgian Bullets, after the speed and shape of the vehicles. The Bullets also qualified for the 2014 Winter Olympics.

Current

The team which participated at the 2014 Winter Olympics in Sochi is as follows:

Olympic medals

See also
 Bobsleigh at the Winter Olympics

References

External links
 Facebook page

National bobsleigh teams
National team
Bobsled
Bobsled